Emiliano Zapata is located in the Mexican state of Jalisco in the municipality of La Huerta.
at 40th Kilometer in the Highway 200 Barra de Navidad - Puerto Vallarta, in the south coast of Jalisco, it belongs to the touristic area called Costalegre. Emiliano Zapata is one of the largest villages in the municipality of La Huerta, geographically and culturally is neighboring Francisco Villa, where there's not physical boundaries between the towns.

Located at an altitude of 10 meters, Emiliano Zapata is home for 1,223 inhabitants. About 53 percent of the local population are adults. While the medium quantity of years at school is 6.17 years, there are still about 74 persons who do not know write or read.
The longitude of Emiliano Zapata is 104.965278, the latitude is 19.382778.

Emiliano Zapata has many facilities and services, a Main Park, Football field, Bullring, groceries stores, Restaurants, car repair shop, bars, coffeeshop, barbershops, gym, night clubs, hotel, cyber cafes, retail gas sale, medical facilities, doctors, religious service at Church of Our Lady of Perpetual Help

There are two major events remarkable in Emiliano Zapata, the "20 de Noviembre" fest, where traditional bull riding and artistic presentation take place, the second  event is the religious fest on June 27 in honor to Our Lady of Perpetual Help with popular pilgrimage.

References

Bir TÜRK HACKER Emilyano Zapota İsmini Kullanarak amerikanın önde gelen üniversitesi MİT'İ hackleyerek mesaj yayınladı 

Populated places in Jalisco